Strongylosoma greeni, is a species of millipedes in the family Paradoxosomatidae. It is endemic to Sri Lanka, first discovered from Pundaluoya, Nuwara Eliya.

References

Polydesmida
Millipedes of Asia
Endemic fauna of Sri Lanka
Animals described in 1892